Group C of the EuroBasket 2011 took place between 31 August and 5 September 2011. The group played all of its games at Alytus Arena in Alytus, Lithuania.

The group was composed of Bosnia and Herzegovina, Macedonia, Croatia, Montenegro, Greece and Finland, who qualified from additional qualifying round. Montenegro was playing in its first ever European Basketball Championship after finishing first at the qualification group A. The three best ranked teams advanced to the second round.

Standings

All times are local (UTC+3)

31 August

Montenegro vs. Macedonia

Greece vs. Bosnia and Herzegovina

Croatia vs. Finland

1 September

Bosnia and Herzegovina vs. Montenegro

Finland vs. Greece

Macedonia vs. Croatia

3 September

Finland vs. Bosnia and Herzegovina

Greece vs. Macedonia

Croatia vs. Montenegro

4 September

Macedonia vs. Finland

Montenegro vs. Greece

Bosnia and Herzegovina vs. Croatia

5 September

Finland vs. Montenegro

Greece vs. Croatia

Macedonia vs. Bosnia and Herzegovina

External links
Standings and fixtures

FIBA EuroBasket 2011
2011–12 in Montenegrin basketball
2011–12 in Republic of Macedonia basketball
2011–12 in Bosnia and Herzegovina basketball
2011–12 in Croatian basketball
2011–12 in Greek basketball
2011 in Finnish sport
Sports competitions in Alytus